Ermont is a commune in the Val-d'Oise department, in the northern suburbs of Paris, France. It has around 28,000 inhabitants, which makes Ermont one of the most important cities in Val d'Oise. Ermont has experienced rapid urbanization thanks to railway transport and industrialization, with the population of Ermont being just 9000 after the Second World War to now more than 28,000.

Population

Transport
Ermont is served by Ermont–Eaubonne station which is an interchange station on Paris RER line C, on the Transilien Paris-Nord suburban rail line, and on the Transilien Paris-Saint-Lazare suburban rail line.

Ermont is also served by Cernay station which is an interchange station on Paris RER line C and on the Transilien Paris-Nord suburban rail line.

Finally, Ermont is also served by two stations on the Transilien Paris – Nord suburban rail line: Ermont-Halte and Gros Noyer–Saint-Prix.

Personalities
Anita Conti, explorer and photographer,
Marc Foucan, athlete
Yvonne Lefébure, concert pianist and teacher
Pierre Leyris, translator
Landing Sané, basketball player
DJ Snake, DJ and record producer
Alice Taglioni, actress

Twin towns - sister cities

Ermont is twinned with:

 Adria, Italy
 Banbury, England, United Kingdom
 Lampertheim, Germany
 Loja, Spain
 Longwan (Wenzhou), China
 Maldegem, Belgium
 Świdnica, Poland

See also
Communes of the Val-d'Oise department
Raymond Couvègnes

References

External links

Official website 

Communes of Val-d'Oise